Bibaa Henry (aged 46) and Nicole Smallman (aged 27) were two sisters who were stabbed to death by Danyal Hussein in Fryent Country Park, Kingsbury, north-west London, England, on 6 June 2020. The reporting and investigation of their killings provoked widespread discussion of women's safety, police misconduct and systemic racism. It also provoked discussion of the access to violent Satanist material available online, which was a motive of the killer.

The mother of the two victims Mina Smallman called on the Metropolitan Police Chief Cressida Dick to resign over the way the case was handled.  Due to this and other controversies, Dick later agreed to resign.

Murders 
Bibaa Henry lived in Wembley, north-west London, and was a social worker at Buckinghamshire Council  described by her family as being "a passionate advocate for safeguarding vulnerable children and families". Nicole Smallman lived in Harrow, north-west London, and worked as a freelance photographer. They were the daughters of the Venerable Mina Smallman, the Church of England's first female archdeacon from a black and minority ethnic background. Their killings occurred whilst the UK was in lockdown due to the COVID-19 pandemic.  The sisters' family reported them missing on 6 June 2020.

Henry, Smallman, and friends had been celebrating Henry's birthday by hosting a picnic in Fryent Country Park on the evening of 5 June 2020. In the early hours of Saturday 6 June 2020, the sisters were murdered. CCTV footage captured the sisters making their way to the birthday picnic, held locally due to COVID-19 lockdown restrictions in the United Kingdom. After guests had left the celebration, the two sisters remained in the park, as evidenced by photographs from a cell phone recovered at the scene; in some of the images, Henry and Smallman are seen playing with strings of lights.  In the first 36 hours the police showed little interest in searching for the missing women. Once the women were found, officers of the Metropolitan Police searched the area for evidence.

Perpetrator
19-year-old Danyal Hussein of Guy Barnet Grove, Eltham, in south-east London, had drawn up a handwritten contract, signed in his own blood, in which he had made a pact with a 'demon' called "Lucifuge Rofocale", to murder six women every six months in return for financial reward including winning the 'Mega Millions Super Jackpot'. 

According to neighbours, Hussein's father had concerns about his son falling in with "the wrong crowd".

At the Old Bailey, Oliver Glasgow QC said "Why he chose [the sisters] or what it was about them that caught his attention is also unclear. But, once their friends had left, two of them were far more vulnerable: distracted by the fun they were having, eye-catching because of the lights they were playing with, and now on their own." 

Hussein suffered a cut to his hand during his crimes. When he needed treatment for it the next day, he claimed he had been mugged. Investigators believed he would have committed more murders had it not been for the injury, which impeded his ability to hold objects. Around a month after the murders, a DNA sample was linked by police to Hussein's father, who had a past caution. For this reason, the Husseins' home was raided by police.

From October 2017 to May 2018, he was monitored by the Prevent strategy when at 15, he accessed far-right material on computers at Thomas Tallis School. Police searches of his devices after his arrest showed that he was still accessing far-right and Satanist material. Hussein is on the autistic spectrum.

Hussein was a viewer of videos by Utah-based Matthew Lawrence, also known as E. A. Koetting, a jailed member of the Satanist Order of Nine Angles. Lawrence's videos were subsequently removed from social media. Hussein was active on a Satanic forum led by Lawrence, alleging he was a 'psychic vampire' and asked for advice about demonic pacts. Hussein was active on that forum for two years and last logged in hours before his arrest.  Lawrence advised that pacts should be entered to Lucifuge, signed in blood, brought to Lucifuge with only candle light, and organised for wealth; Hussein followed these instructions.  In ten days following the murders, Hussein spent £162.88 on lottery tickets and bets but won nothing.

Legal proceedings
Danyal Hussein was arrested and charged with two counts of murder. He told police he had Asperger syndrome and memory problems and refused to answer questions. He pleaded not guilty at the Old Bailey on 11 March 2021. The trial began on 9 June 2021 at the Old Bailey. Prosecutor, Oliver Glasgow QC told the jury, "Given the weight of the evidence against him, only someone who actually believes that an agreement with a demon will work could refuse to accept any aspect of the case against him. (...) It is hard to imagine that anyone could do to another human being what this defendant did to Bibaa and Nicole; but to have planned it, to have prepared it and to have performed it with such ruthless selfishness is truly terrifying.  He did not care what he had to do to get what he wanted, and these two women were nothing more than a means to a very disturbing end." 

Hussein was convicted of both murders on 6 July 2021. In October 2021 Mrs Justice Whipple sentenced him to life imprisonment with a minimum term of 35 years.  Whipple told Hussein,  "You committed these vicious attacks. You did it to kill. You did it for money and a misguided pursuit of power.  This was a calculated and deliberate course of conduct, planned and carried out with precision.  Bizarre though the pact with the devil may appear to others, this was your belief system, your own commitment to the murder of innocent women."

Police misconduct 
In the month following the incident, two police officers, PC Deniz Jaffer, 48, and PC Jamie Lewis, 33, were charged with misconduct for sharing "inappropriate" photographs of the crime scene, causing distress to the family and general public. The officers had taken selfies next to the sisters' dead bodies. The Independent Office for Police Conduct (IOPC) launched an inquiry into the behaviour of the police officers. Images had been shared on a WhatsApp group and a further six officers were investigated for failing to either challenge or report this. The IPOC reported that: "The investigation has also uncovered further alleged misconduct breaches of the standards of professional behaviour for a small number of officers which include honesty and integrity, and equality and diversity". The two officers pleaded guilty to misconduct in public office. Lewis was dismissed from the police, while Jaffer had already resigned. 

In December 2021, the two officers were each sentenced to two years and nine months in jail. Mina Smallman, mother of the murdered sisters said in a victim impact statement, "It made me think of the lynchings in the Deep South of USA where you would see smiling faces around a hanging dead body. Those police officers felt so safe, so untouchable that they felt they would take photographs with our murdered daughters. Those police officers dehumanised our children." Jaffer and Lewis had undermined trust in the police, an Old Bailey judge said when jailing them.  Following investigation of Jaffer's phone, it was found that he had used racist language regarding a separate case involving the assault of South Asian men.  In June 2022 three police officers who received the pictures without challenging them or reporting them each received written warnings but were allowed to keep their jobs.  Former Met chief superintendent Del Babu said "If you have something as horrific as pictures of dead women taken, the individuals should be reported.  It is more appropriate for them not to be in the police service. The fact they remain is worrying. It sends out the wrong message. It will only add to the heartache of the family. It does not reflect the seriousness of what they did."

Mina Smallman has since worked to raise awareness of the misconduct of the police and failures in the investigation of her daughters' deaths. She said that racism ensured that the coverage of these black women's deaths was different from similar instances of stranger killings of white women.  Mina Smallman maintains the police did not care about the missing sisters before the bodies were found because one was "a black woman who lives on a council estate."

Mina Smallman spoke about Hussein after his conviction, saying that she would not spend her life hating him; she voiced concern that he would be further radicalised in prison. 

The Independent Office for Police Conduct (IOPC) carried out a separate inquiry into how calls from worried relatives and friends were handled by the police. The level of service provided  by the  police force to the  family was found to be "unacceptable". An apology was issued to the family .  The IOPC stated that police logs were closed after a family member gave information about the sisters' possible whereabouts, but a communications supervisor recorded the information "inaccurately".

Reactions 
Vigils were held to remember the victims. The vigil at Fryent Country Park on 3 August 2021 organised by Reclaim These Streets (the same group who organised the vigil for Sarah Everard), was attended by Mayor of London, Sadiq Khan, Dawn Butler, David Lammy and other notable figures.

The family considered legal action over the police misconduct. Dame Cressida Dick of the Metropolitan Police said: "The Met is not free of discrimination, racism or bias. I have always acknowledged that and do now again"

Barry Gardiner MP of the local Brent North constituency told the Today programme that the Metropolitan Police "need to have a root and branch reform in the way in which it operates, the way in which it treats people". A local councillor for Brent who leads the borough's community safety also criticised the Met, telling the Brent & Kilburn Times that an apology is "no substitute for action."

Violence against women and girls
In the year following their deaths were mentioned in coverage relating to the murders of other women in London such as Sarah Everard and Sabina Nessa. While each incident was different, they served to frame a wider picture of the tackling of violence against women in London and in the UK more widely. 

In the foreword of the UK government's strategy for tackling violence against women and girls the Home Secretary Priti Patel  said "these crimes are still far too prevalent and there are too many instances of victims and survivors being let down. The tragic cases of Sarah Everard, Julia James, Bibaa Henry and Nicole Smallman touched us all. But for every high-profile case, there are sadly many more. And the pandemic has brought new challenges and presented sick perpetrators with new opportunities as more people stayed at home and went online".

References 

2020 in London
2020 murders in the United Kingdom
2020s murders in London
2020s trials
21st century in the London Borough of Brent
Crimes involving Satanism or the occult
Female murder victims
History of the Metropolitan Police
June 2020 crimes in Europe
June 2020 events in the United Kingdom
Murder trials
Police misconduct in England
Sisters
Stabbing attacks in London
Trials in London
Violence against women in London